Raptors  is a 1948 Czechoslovak drama film directed by Jiří Weiss.

Cast
 Vítězslav Vejražka as František Rýdl
 L. H. Struna as Václav Rýdl
 Marie Nademlejnská as Marie Rýdlová
 Saša Rašilov as Martin Žůrek
 Jindřich Plachta as Gardener Antonín Carda
 Jiří Plachý as Construction company owner Novotný
 Bohuš Záhorský as Businessman Kristián Krofta
 Viola Zinková as Irena
 Otomar Krejča as disponent Hrubý

References

External links
 

1948 films
1940s Czech-language films
Czech drama films
Czechoslovak black-and-white films
1940s Czech films